San Lorenzo Ruiz Center of Studies and Schools (SLRCSS) is a school in Dolores, City of San Fernando, Pampanga serving preschool through the sixth grade and fourth year. It was founded on September 28, 1990, by a group of professional educators.

Move to Dolores 

Due to the unprecedented growth in enrollment, the school had to move its grade school in SY 1994–95 to its present site in a  campus at Villa de San Lorenzo, Saint Dominic Corinthian Annex, Dolores, City of San Fernando, Pampanga. The preschool was transferred the following school year.

The founders of the school also wanted create a high school, but due to the calamity that devastated Pampanga and the nearby provinces on October 1, 1995, the school had to defer its plan. Instead of opening a high school, a branch was established at the L&S Subdivision, Angeles City in SY 1996–97. In the SY 2003-04 the Angeles Branch was transferred to the border lots of Holy Angel Village Phase 1 and Angeles Industrial Park. Initially, its course offerings were from nursery school to second grade.  In SY 1997-98 third three followed, then grades four to six were added to its elementary course offering one grade after another in the succeeding school years. It had its first batch of elementary-level graduates in March 2001.

College in SLRCSS 

In the 1999–2000 school year, San Lorenzo College of Education opened offering a Bachelor in Elementary Education (BEEd) and a Bachelor in Secondary Education (BSEd). Both courses offer common majors: English, Science and Mathematics. Early Childhood Education is an additional major for BEEd.

That year, the new building (part to be an extension of an older existing 3-storey building) was also opened to students.

Further changes 

In 2003 the school inaugurated the plans constructing the SLR Ecology Garden. The next school year another three-story building was completed (although in the SY 2003-04 the ground floor of the said building was already in use). Also in the SY 2004-05 a San Lorenzo Ruiz statue was inaugurated as part of the mini park - the SLRian Park.

Sections

1st Grade: Faith and Hope

2nd Grade: Love and Joy

3rd Grade: Happiness and Justice

4th Grade: Peace and Truth

5th Grade: Harmony and Unity

6th Grade: Kindness and Honesty

References

Schools in San Fernando, Pampanga
Educational institutions established in 1990
1990 establishments in the Philippines